Biatorbágy is a town in Pest County, Budapest metropolitan area, Hungary. It has a population of 13,889 (2019).

Districts
 Bia
 Torbágy

History

On 13 September 1931 a demented man (Szilveszter Matuska) blasted the train to Vienna on the viaduct of Biatorbágy.

Sport
Biatorbágyi SE, association football club

Twin towns – sister cities

Biatorbágy is twinned with:
 Herbrechtingen, Germany (1989) 
 Remetea, Romania (2001)
 Kiti, Cyprus (2004)
 Dolný Štál, Slovakia (2012)  
 Velyka Dobron, Ukraine (2013)

Notable people
Ferenc Juhász (1928–2015), poet
Gyula Juhász (1930–1993), historian
Csaba Horváth (born 1971), canoeist

References

External links

 in Hungarian, English and German

Hungarian German communities
Populated places in Pest County
Budapest metropolitan area